Eugene "Gene" Krebs was a member of the Ohio House of Representatives from 1993 to 2000.  His district consisted of a portion of Butler County, Ohio.  He was succeeded by Shawn Webster. Krebs was also County Commissioner of Pleble County, Ohio for four years.

Krebs previously served as a collegiate fencing coach. For his dedication to the sport, the Gene Krebs Memorial Tournament was held in Krebs' honor at Miami University, his alma mater, on April 9, 2022. It is important to note that despite the "memorial" verbiage, Krebs is still a living person and was in attendance.

References

Republican Party members of the Ohio House of Representatives
Living people
Year of birth missing (living people)